Tanya Mirabal Moya is an American politician and educator serving as a member of the New Mexico House of Representatives for the 7th district. Elected in November 2022, she assumed office on January 1, 2023.

Education 
Mirabal Moya earned a Bachelor of Science in health and wellness from Purdue University Global and a Master of Science in sports management, coaching, and athletic administration from Liberty University.

Career 
Outside of politics, Mirabal Moya teaches physics and biology at Belén High School. She was elected to the New Mexico House of Representatives in November 2022.

References 

Living people
New Mexico Republicans
Members of the New Mexico House of Representatives
Women state legislators in New Mexico
Purdue University alumni
Liberty University alumni
People from Belen, New Mexico
People from Valencia County, New Mexico
Year of birth missing (living people)